The Makhulong Stadium (sometimes referred to as Tembisa Stadium) is a South African multi-sports stadium in Tembisa, a township of Ekurhuleni.
In 2009, it underwent a R38 million renovation and was brought up to Premier Soccer League standards.

In June 2010 a stampede of spectators before an exhibition game between the Nigeria and North Korea national football teams injured 16 people.

In March 2020, the Ekurhuleni municipality announced that it would renovate the stadium for Highlands Park F.C.

References

External links
www.ekurhuleni.com
Photos of Stadiums in South Africa at cafe.daum.net/stade

Soccer venues in South Africa
Sports venues in Gauteng
Ekurhuleni